Theodicy means vindication of God. It is to answer the question of why a good God permits the manifestation of evil, thus resolving the issue of the problem of evil. Some theodicies also address the problem of evil "to make the existence of an all-knowing, all-powerful and all-good or omnibenevolent God consistent with the existence of evil or suffering in the world". Unlike a defense, which tries to demonstrate that God's existence is logically possible in the light of evil, a theodicy provides a framework wherein God's existence is also plausible. The German philosopher and mathematician Gottfried Leibniz coined the term "theodicy" in 1710 in his work , though various responses to the problem of evil had been previously proposed. The British philosopher John Hick traced the history of moral theodicy in his 1966 work, Evil and the God of Love, identifying three major traditions:

 the Plotinian theodicy, named after Plotinus
 the Augustinian theodicy, which Hick based on the writings of Augustine of Hippo
 the Irenaean theodicy, which Hick developed, based on the thinking of St. Irenaeus

The problem was also analyzed by premodern theologians and philosophers in the Islamic world. As an alternative to theodicy, a defense has been proposed by the American philosopher Alvin Plantinga, which is focused on showing the logical possibility of God's existence. Plantinga's version of the free-will defence argued that the coexistence of God and evil is not logically impossible, and that free will further explains the existence of evil without contradicting the existence of God.

Similar to a theodicy, a cosmodicy attempts to justify the fundamental goodness of the universe, and an anthropodicy attempts to justify the goodness of humanity.

Definition and etymology
As defined by Alvin Plantinga, theodicy is the "answer to the question of why God permits evil". Theodicy is defined as a theological construct that attempts to vindicate God in response to the problem of evil that appears inconsistent with the existence of an omnipotent and omnibenevolent God. Another definition of theodicy is the vindication of divine goodness and providence in view of the existence of evil. Thus, theodicy literally means "justifying God".

In the Internet Encyclopedia of Philosophy, Nick Trakakis proposed an additional three requirements which must be contained within a theodicy:
 Common sense views of the world
 Widely held historical and scientific opinion
 Plausible moral principles

As a response to the problem of evil, a theodicy is distinct from a defence. A defence attempts to demonstrate that the occurrence of evil does not contradict God's existence, but it does not propose that rational beings are able to understand why God permits evil. A theodicy shows that it is reasonable to believe in God despite evidence of evil in the world and offers a framework which can account for why evil exists. A theodicy is often based on a prior natural theology, which exist to prove the existence of God, and seeks to demonstrate that God's existence remains probable after the problem of evil is posed by giving a justification for God's permitting evil to happen. Defenses propose solutions to the problem of evil, while theodicies attempt to answer the problem.

Pseudo-Dionysus defines evil by those aspects that show an absence of good. Writers in this tradition saw things as belonging to 'forms' and evil as an absence of being a good example of their form: as a deficit of goodness where goodness ought to have been present. In this same line of thinking, St. Augustine also defined evil as an absence of good, as did theologian and monk Thomas Aquinas, who stated that "a man is called bad insofar as he lacks a virtue, and an eye is called bad insofar as it lacks the power of sight." Bad as an absence of good resurfaces in Hegel, Heidegger and Barth. Very similar are the Neoplatonists, such as Plotinus and contemporary philosopher Denis O'Brien, who say evil is a privation.

Marxism, "selectively elaborating Hegel", defines evil in terms of its effect. Philosopher John Kekes says the effect of evil must include actual harm that "interferes with the functioning of a person as a full-fledged agent". Christian philosophers and theologians such as Richard Swinburne and N. T. Wright also define evil in terms of effect, stating that an "act is objectively good (or bad) if it is good (or bad) in its consequences". Hinduism defines evil in terms of its effect saying "the evils that afflict people (and indeed animals) in the present life are the effects of wrongs committed in a previous life." Some contemporary philosophers argue a focus on the effects of evil is inadequate as a definition since evil can observe without actively causing the harm, and it is still evil.

Philosopher Susan Neiman says "a crime against humanity is something for which we have procedures, ... [and it] can be ... fit into the rest of our experience. To call an action evil is to suggest that it cannot [be fitted in]".

Immanuel Kant was the first to offer a purely secular theory of evil, giving an evaluative definition of evil based on its cause as having a will that is not fully good. Kant has been an important influence on philosophers like Hannah Arendt, Claudia Card, and Richard Bernstein. "...Hannah Arendt... uses the term [radical evil] to denote a new form of wrongdoing which cannot be captured by other moral concepts." Claudia Card says evil is excessive wrongdoing; others like Hillel Steiner say evil is qualitatively not quantitatively distinct from mere wrongdoing.

Locke, Hobbes and Leibniz define good and evil in terms of pleasure and pain. Others such as Richard Swinburne find that definition inadequate, saying, "the good of individual humans...consists...in their having free will...the ability to develop ...character..., to show courage and loyalty, to love, to be of use, to contemplate beauty and discover truth... All that [good]...cannot be achieved without ... suffering along the way."

Some theorists define evil by what emotions are connected to it. "For example, Laurence Thomas believes that evildoers take delight in causing harm or feel hatred toward their victims (Thomas 1993, 76–77)." Buddhism defines various types of evil, one type defines as behavior resulting from a failure to emotionally detach from the world.

Christian theologians generally define evil in terms of both human responsibility and the nature of God: "If we take the essentialist view of Christian ethics... evil is anything contrary to God's good nature...(character or attributes)." The Judaic view, while acknowledging the difference between the human and divine perspective of evil, is rooted in the nature of creation itself and the limitation inherent in matter's capacity to be perfected; the action of free will includes the potential for perfection from individual effort and leaves the responsibility for evil in human hands.

As Swinburne notes: "[It is] deeply central to the whole tradition of Christian (and other western) religion that God is loving toward his creation and that involves him behaving in morally good ways toward it." Within Christianity, "God is supposed to be in some way personal... a being who is essentially eternal, omnipotent, omniscient, Creator and sustainer of the universe, and perfectly good. An omnipotent being is one who can do anything logically possible... such a being could not make me exist and not exist at the same time but he could eliminate the stars... An omniscient being is one who knows everything logically possible for him to know" "God's perfect goodness is moral goodness."

Reasons for theodicy
Theodicies are developed to answer the question of why a good God permits the manifestation of evil, thus resolving the issue of the problem of evil. Some theodicies also address the problem of evil "to make the existence of an all-knowing, all-powerful and all-good or omnibenevolent God consistent with the existence of evil or suffering in the world".

The philosopher Richard Swinburne says "most theists need a theodicy, [they need] an account of reasons why God might allow evil to occur."

According to Loke, theodicies might have a therapeutical use for some people, though their main purpose is to provide a sound theistic argument rather than to succeed as a therapy. Howebeit, theodicies do "seek to provide hope to the sufferers that... evils can be defeated just as minor tribulations can be defeated.

History
The term theodicy was coined by the German philosopher Gottfried Leibniz in his 1710 work, written in French,  (Theodicy: Essays on the Goodness of God, the Freedom of Man and the Origin of Evil). Leibniz's  was a response to skeptical Protestant philosopher Pierre Bayle, who wrote in his work  that, after rejecting three attempts to solve it, he saw no rational solution to the problem of evil. Bayle argued that, because the Bible asserts the coexistence of God and evil, this state of affairs must simply be accepted.

In The Catholic Encyclopedia (1914), Constantine Kempf argued that, following Leibniz's work, philosophers called their works on the problem of evil "theodicies", and philosophy about God was brought under the discipline of theodicy. He argued that theodicy began to include all of natural theology, meaning that theodicy came to consist of the human knowledge of God through the systematic use of reason.

In 1966, British philosopher John Hick published Evil and the God of Love, in which he surveyed various Christian responses to the problem of evil, before developing his own. In his work, Hick identified and distinguished between three types of theodicy: Plotinian, which was named after Plotinus, Augustinian, which had dominated Western Christianity for many centuries, and Irenaean, which was developed by the Eastern Church Father Irenaeus, a version of which Hick subscribed to himself.

In his dialogue "Is God a Taoist?", published in 1977 in his book The Tao Is Silent, Raymond Smullyan claims to prove that it is logically impossible to have sentient beings without allowing "evil", even for God, just as it is impossible for him to create a triangle in the Euclidean plane having an angular sum other than 180 degrees. Therefore, the capability of feeling implies free will, which in turn may produce "evil", understood here as hurting other sentient beings. The problem of evil happening to good or innocent people is not addressed directly here, but both reincarnation and karma are hinted at.

Ancient religions
"Writings and discourses on theodicy by Jews, Greeks, Christians, and Eastern religions have graced our planet for thousands of years." In the Middle Kingdom of Egypt (2000 BC to 1700 BC) as "in Ancient Mesopotamian and Israelite literature," theodicy was an important issue.

Philip Irving Mitchell of the Dallas Baptist University notes that some philosophers have cast the pursuit of theodicy as a modern one, as earlier scholars used the problem of evil to support the existence of one particular god over another, explain wisdom, or explain a conversion, rather than to justify God's goodness. Sarah Iles Johnston argues that ancient civilizations, such as the ancient Mesopotamians, Greeks, Romans, and Egyptians held polytheistic beliefs that may have enabled them to deal with the concept of theodicy differently. These religions taught the existence of many gods and goddesses who controlled various aspects of daily life. These early religions may have avoided the question of theodicy by endowing their deities with the same flaws and jealousies that plagued humanity. No one god or goddess was fundamentally good or evil; this explained that bad things could happen to good people if they angered a deity because the gods could exercise the same free will that humankind possesses. Such religions taught that some gods were more inclined to be helpful and benevolent, while others were more likely to be spiteful and aggressive. In this sense, the evil gods could be blamed for misfortune, while the good gods could be petitioned with prayer and sacrifices to make things right. There was still a sense of justice in that individuals who were right with the gods could avoid punishment.

The "Epicurean trilemma", however, was already raised  by Epicurus, according to David Hume in 1779. According to Hume, the trilemma describes the problem of reconciling an omnipotent deity with their benevolence and the existence of evil. However, if Epicurus did write a discussion on the specific problems that Hume attributes to him, it would not have been tied with the question of an omnibenevolent and omniscient God, as Hume assumes (for Hume does not cite, nor make any implication that he had knowledge of Epicurus's writings on this matter that held any greater weight than academic hearsay or legend).

Biblical theodicy

The biblical account of the justification of evil and suffering in the presence of God has both similarities and contrasts in the Hebrew Bible and the New Testament. For the Hebrew Bible, the Book of Job is often quoted as the authoritative source of discussion.

It is generally accepted that God's responsive speeches in Job do not directly answer Job's complaints; God does not attempt to justify himself or reveal the reason for Job's suffering to him; instead, God's speeches focus on increasing Job's overall understanding of his relationship with God. This exemplifies Biblical theodicy. There is general agreement among Bible scholars that the Bible "does not admit of a singular perspective on evil... Instead we encounter a variety of perspectives... Consequently [the Bible focuses on] moral and spiritual remedies, not rational or logical [justifications]... It is simply that the Bible operates within a cosmic, moral and spiritual landscape rather than within a rationalist, abstract, ontological landscape."

This is in evidence in God's first and second speech in Job. God's first speech concerns human ignorance and God's authority. Job had seen himself at the center of events, lamenting that God has singled him out to oppress; God responds that Job is not the center, God is; his kingdom is complex, he governs on a large scale. Since God is in dominion over all the earth, Job cannot conceivably condemn him, unless Job were to prove that he can do all the things God can. God's second speech is against human self-righteousness. Job has vehemently accused God of thwarting justice as "the omnipotent tyrant, the cosmic thug". Some scholars interpret God's response as an admission of failure on his part, but he goes on to say he has the power and in his own timing will bring justice in the end.

"Isaiah is generally recognized as one of the most progressive books of the prophetic corpus." Christian theologians state that in the Bible "suffering is understood as having transcendent meaning... human agency can give particular instances of suffering a mystical significance that transforms it into something productive."

Theodicy in the Book of Ezekiel (and also in Jeremiah 31:29-30) confronts the concept of personal moral responsibility. The book exemplifies the power of sin in that "The main point is stated at the beginning and at the end—"the soul that sins shall die." This 'power of sin' was abolished in the death and resurrection of Jesus Christ which renders all believers in Christ and his resurrection, forgiven and therefore righteous. The aforementioned main point "is explicated by a case history of a family traced through three generations." It is not about heredity but is about understanding divine justice in a world under divine governance.

"Theodicy in the Minor Prophets differs little from that in Isaiah, Jeremiah and Ezekiel." For example, the first chapter of Habakkuk raises questions about God's justice, laments God's inaction in punishing injustice, and looks for God's action in response—then objects to what God chooses. Instead of engaging in debate, God gives Habakkuk a vision of the future which includes five oracles that form a theodicy:

 God has a plan and has appointed a time for judgment. It may be slow in coming as humans see things, but it will come;
 The woe oracles confront the prevalence of evil in the world and the justice those acts have earned;
 The vision of the manifestation of God is a recognition of God's power to address these issues;
 God as a warrior will fight for his people;
 The song of triumph says the faithful will prevail by holding to trust and hope.

Joel and the other minor prophets demonstrate that theodicy and eschatology are connected in the Bible.

Psalm 73 presents the internal struggle created by personal suffering and the prosperity of the wicked. The writer gains perspective when he "enters the sanctuary of God (16-17)" seeing that God's justice will eventually prevail. He reaffirms his relationship with God, is ashamed of his resentment, and chooses trust. Psalm 77 contains real outspokenness to God as well as determination to hold onto faith and trust.

For Christians, the Scriptures assure them that the allowance of evil is for a good purpose based on relationship with God. "Some of the good ... cannot be achieved without delay and suffering, and the evil of this world is indeed necessary for the achievement of those good purposes. ... God has the right to allow such evils to occur, so long as the 'goods' are facilitated and the 'evils' are limited and compensated in the way that various other Christian doctrines (of human free will, life after death, the end of the world, etc.) affirm... the 'good states' which (according to Christian doctrine) God seeks are so good that they outweigh the accompanying evils."

This is somewhat illustrated in the Book of Exodus when Pharaoh is described as being raised up that God's name be known in all the earth Exodus 9:16. This is mirrored in Romans' ninth chapter, where Paul appeals to God's sovereignty as sufficient explanation, with God's goodness experientially known to the Christian.

Augustinian theodicy

The Protestant and Reformed reading of Augustinian theodicy, as promoted primarily by John Hick, is based on the writings of Augustine of Hippo, a Christian philosopher and theologian who lived from AD 354 to 430. The Catholic (pre-reformation) formulation of the same issue is substantially different and is outlined below. In Hick's approach, this form of theodicy argues that evil does not exist except as a privation—or corruption—of goodness, and therefore God did not create evil. Augustinian scholars have argued that God created the world perfectly, with no evil or human suffering. Evil entered the world through the disobedience of Adam and Eve and the theodicy casts the existence of evil as a just punishment for this original sin. The theodicy argues that humans have an evil nature in as much as it is deprived of its original goodness, form, order, and measure due to the inherited original sin of Adam and Eve, but still ultimately remains good due to existence coming from God, for if a nature was completely evil (deprived of the good), it would cease to exist. It maintains that God remains blameless and good.

In the Roman Catholic reading of Augustine, the issue of just war as developed in his book The City of God substantially established his position concerning the positive justification of killing, suffering and pain as inflicted upon an enemy when encountered in war for a just cause. Augustine asserted that peacefulness in the face of a grave wrong that could only be stopped by violence would be a sin. Defense of one's self or others could be a necessity, especially when authorized by a legitimate authority. While not elaborating the conditions necessary for war to be just, Augustine nonetheless originated the very phrase, itself, in his work The City of God. In essence, the pursuit of peace must include the option of fighting with all of its eventualities in order to preserve peace in the long-term. Such a war could not be pre-emptive, but defensive, to restore peace. Thomas Aquinas, centuries later, used the authority of Augustine's arguments in an attempt to define the conditions under which a war could be just.

Irenaean theodicy

Irenaeus (died ), born in the early 2nd century, expressed ideas which explained the existence of evil as necessary for human development. Irenaeus argued that human creation comprised two parts: humans were made first in the image, then in the likeness, of God. The image of God consists of having the potential to achieve moral perfection, whereas the likeness of God is the achievement of that perfection. To achieve moral perfection, Irenaeus suggested that humans must have free will. To achieve such free will, humans must experience suffering and God must be at an epistemic distance (a distance of knowledge) from humanity. Therefore, evil exists to allow humans to develop as moral agents. In the 20th century, John Hick collated the ideas of Irenaeus into a distinct theodicy. He argued that the world exists as a "vale of soul-making" (a phrase that he drew from John Keats), and that suffering and evil must therefore occur. He argued that human goodness develops through the experience of evil and suffering.

Origenian theodicy
In direct response to John Hick's description of theodicy, Mark Scott has indicated that neither Augustine of Hippo nor Irenaeus of Lyons provide an appropriate context for the discussion of Hick's theistic version of theodicy. Neither Irenaeus nor Augustine endorsed a theology of universal salvation in any form comparable to that of John Hick.

Relatively minor theodicies
Michael Martin summarizes what he calls "relatively minor" theodicies:
 The Finite God theodicy maintains that God is all-good (omnibenevolent) but not all-powerful (omnipotent).
 The Best of all possible worlds theodicy, a traditional theology and defended by Leibniz, argues that the creation is the best of all possible worlds.
 The Original Sin theodicy holds that evil came into the world because of humanity's original sin.
 The Ultimate Harmony theodicy justifies evil as leading to "good long-range consequences".
 The Degree of Desirability of a Conscious State theodicy has been reckoned a "complex theodicy." It argues that a person's state is deemed evil only when it is undesirable to the person. However, because God is unable to make a person's state desirable to the person, the theodic problem does not exist.
 The Reincarnation theodicy believes that people suffer evil because of their wrongdoing in a previous life.
 The Contrast theodicy holds that evil is needed to enable people to appreciate or understand good.
 The Warning theodicy rationalizes evil as God's warning to people to mend their ways.

Islamic world 
Mu'tazila theologians approached the problem of theodicy within a framework of moral realism, according to which the moral value of acts is accessible to unaided reason, so that humans can make moral judgments about divine acts. They argued that the divine act of creation is good despite existence of suffering, because it allows humans a compensation of greater reward in the afterlife. They posited that individuals have free will to commit evil and absolved God of responsibility for such acts. God's justice thus consists of punishing wrongdoers. Following the demise of Mu'tazila as a school, their theodicy was adopted in the Zaydi and Twelver branches of Shia Islam.

Most Sunni theologians analyzed theodicy from an anti-realist metaethical standpoint. Ash'ari theologians argued that ordinary moral judgments stem from emotion and social convention, which are inadequate to either condemn or justify divine actions. Ash'arites hold that God creates everything, including human actions, but distinguish creation from acquisition of actions. They allow individuals the latter ability, though they do not posit existence of free will in a fuller sense of the term. In the words of Al-Shahrastani (1086–1153):

Ash'ari theology insists on ultimate divine transcendence and teaches that human knowledge regarding it is limited to what has been revealed through the prophets, so that on the question of God's creation of evil, revelation has to accepted  (without [asking] how).

Maturidi, in contrast to Ash'arites, holds that human mind is able to grasp good and evil independent from revelation. Contrary to the Mu'tazilites, he disagrees that God's wisdom entails creating only good. Since rights could not exist before God created anything, God is not bound to responsibilities for creations. Instead, God's wisdom means that God puts everything in its proper place. He cites Surah Al Imran verse 178, to point out that God does not regard believers and unbelievers as equal; God would increase the sin of the sinners (and guide the believers). He criticizes believing that God only creates good as remnants of Persian dualistic religions, improper for God.

Ibn Sina, the most influential Muslim philosopher, analyzed theodicy from a purely ontological, neoplatonic standpoint, aiming to prove that God, as the absolutely good First Cause, created a good world. Ibn Sina argued that evil refers either to a cause of an entity (such as burning in a fire), being a quality of another entity, or to its imperfection (such as blindness), in which case it does not exist as an entity. According to Ibn Sina, such qualities are necessary attributes of the best possible order of things, so that the good they serve is greater than the harm they cause.

Philosophical Sufi theologians such as Ibn Arabi were influenced by the neoplatonic theodicy of Ibn Sina. Al-Ghazali anticipated the optimistic theodicy of Leibniz in his dictum "There is nothing in possibility more wonderful than what is." Fakhr al-Din al-Razi, who represented the mainstream Sunni view, challenged Ibn Sina's analysis and argued that it merely sidesteps the real problem of evil, which is rooted in the human experience of suffering in a world that contains more pain than pleasure.

The Hanbali scholar Ibn Taymiyya, whose writings became influential in Wahhabism, argued that, while God creates human acts, humans are responsible for their deeds as the agents of their acts. He held that divine creation is good from a causal standpoint, as God creates all things for wise purposes. Thus apparent evil is in actuality good in view of its purpose, and pure evil does not exist. This analysis was developed further with practical illustrations by Ibn al-Qayyim.

Alternatives

Jewish anti-theodicy

In 1998, Jewish theologian Zachary Braiterman coined the term anti-theodicy in his book (God) After Auschwitz to describe Jews, both in a biblical and post-Holocaust context, whose response to the problem of evil is protest and refusal to investigate the relationship between God and suffering. An anti-theodicy acts in opposition to a theodicy and places full blame for all experience of evil onto God, but must rise from an individual's belief in and love of God. Anti-theodicy has been likened to Job's protests in the Book of Job. Braiterman wrote that an anti-theodicy rejects the idea that there is a meaningful relationship between God and evil or that God could be justified for the experience of evil.

 The Holocaust prompted a reconsideration of theodicy in some Jewish circles. French Jewish philosopher Emmanuel Levinas, who had himself been a prisoner of war in Nazi Germany, declared theodicy to be "blasphemous", arguing that it is the "source of all immorality", and demanded that the project of theodicy be ended. Levinas asked whether the idea of absolutism survived after the Holocaust; he proposed it did. He argued that humans are not called to justify God in the face of evil, but to attempt to live godly lives; rather than considering whether God was present during the Holocaust, the duty of humans is to build a world where goodness will prevail.

Professor of theology David R. Blumenthal, in his book Facing the Abusing God, supports the "theology of protest", which he saw as presented in the 1979 play, The Trial of God. He supports the view that survivors of the Holocaust cannot forgive God and so must protest about it. Blumenthal believes that a similar theology is presented in the Book of Job, in which Job does not question God's existence or power, but his morality and justice. Other prominent voices in the Jewish tradition include the Nobel prize winning author Elie Wiesel and Richard L. Rubinstein in his book The Cunning of History.

 Rabbi Menachem Mendel Schneerson, the seventh Rebbe of Chabad Lubavitch, sought to elucidate how faith (or trust) in God defines the full, transcendental preconditions of anti-theodicy. Endorsing the attitude of "holy protest" found in the stories of Job and Jeremiah, but also in those of Abraham (Genesis 18) and Moses (Exodus 33), Rabbi Schneerson argued that a phenomenology of protest, when carried through to its logical limits, reveals a profound conviction in cosmic justice such as is first found in Abraham's question: "Will the Judge of the whole earth not do justice?" (Genesis 18:25). Recalling Kant's 1791 essay on the failure of all theoretical attempts in theodicy, a viable practical theodicy is identified with messianism. This faithful anti-theodicy is worked out in a long letter of 26 April 1965 to Elie Wiesel.

Christian alternatives to theodicy
A number of Christian writers oppose theodicies. Todd Billings deems constructing theodicies to be a "destructive practice". In the same vein, Nick Trakakis observes that "theodical discourse can only add to the world's evils, not remove or illuminate them." As an alternative to theodicy, some theologians have advocated "reflection on tragedy" as a more befitting reply to evil. For example, Wendy Farley believes that "a desire for justice" and "anger and pity at suffering" should replace "theodicy's cool justifications of evil". Sarah K. Pinnock opposes abstract theodicies that would legitimize evil and suffering. However, she endorses theodicy discussions in which people ponder God, evil, and suffering from a practical faith perspective.

 In an essay for The Hedgehog Review, Eugene McCarraher called David Bentley Hart's 2005 book The Doors of the Sea "a ferocious attack on theodicy in the wake of the previous year’s tsunami" (referring to the 2004 tsunami in the Indian Ocean). As Hart says on page 58 of the book: "The principal task of theodicy is to explain why paradise is not a logical possibility." Hart's refusal to concede that theodicy has any positive capacity to explain the purpose of evil is in line with many Greek church fathers. For example, see Eric D. Perl's Theophany: The Neoplatonic Philosophy of Dionysius the Areopagite:

Karl Barth viewed the evil of human suffering as ultimately in the "control of divine providence". Given this view, Barth deemed it impossible for humans to devise a theodicy that establishes "the idea of the goodness of God". For Barth, only the crucifixion could establish the goodness of God. In the crucifixion, God bears and suffers what humanity suffers. This suffering by God Himself makes human theodicies anticlimactic. Barth found a "twofold justification" in the crucifixion: the justification of sinful humanity and "the justification in which God justifies Himself".

Christian Science offers a solution to the problem by denying that evil ultimately exists. Mary Baker Eddy and Mark Twain had some contrasting views on theodicy and suffering, which are well-described by Stephen Gottschalk.

Redemptive suffering, based in Pope John Paul II's theology of the body, embraces suffering as having value in and of itself. Eleonore Stump in Wandering in Darkness uses psychology, narrative and exegesis to demonstrate that redemptive suffering, as found in Thomistic theodicy, can constitute a consistent and cogent defence for the problem of suffering.

Free-will defense

As an alternative to a theodicy, a defense may be offered as a response to the problem of evil. A defense attempts to show that God's existence is not made logically impossible by the existence of evil; it does not need to be true or plausible, merely logically possible. American philosopher Alvin Plantinga offers a free-will defense which argues that human free will sufficiently explains the existence of evil while maintaining that God's existence remains logically possible. He argues that, if God's existence and the existence of evil are to be logically inconsistent, a premise must be provided which, if true, would make them inconsistent; as none has been provided, the existence of God and evil must be consistent. Free will furthers this argument by providing a premise which, in conjunction with the existence of evil, entails that God's existence remains consistent. Opponents have argued this defense is discredited by the existence of non-human related evil such as droughts, tsunamis and malaria.

In his recent book, Evil, Sin and Christian Theism (2022), Andrew Loke develops a Big Picture free-will defense argument arguing that God's justification for allowing suffering is not mainly based on an argument from future benefits but on the very nature of love which involves "allowing humans to exercise their free will in morally significant ways." He employs the Big Picture approach in which "Christian theism provides the big picture and uses a combination of theodicies" in defense of a moderate version of skeptical theism. The Big Picture approach, according to him, helps to put the problem of evil and suffering in perspective of the bigger picture that answers the Big Questions of a worldview such as "What is the greatest good? What is the meaning of life? Where do I come from? Where am I going?" He argues that Christian theism provides the best overall consistent answers to these questions: "the greatest good is to have a right relationship with God, the source of all good. The meaning of life...is to live our lives for the greatest good;...to glorify God and enjoy him..." The bigger picture of a just, all-powerful, and loving God who will ultimately defeat evil serves as the backdrop against which all temporal suffering can obtain a meaningful understanding.

Cosmodicy and anthropodicy

A cosmodicy attempts to justify the fundamental goodness of the universe in the face of evil, and an anthropodicy attempts to justify the fundamental goodness of human nature in the face of the evils produced by humans.

Considering the relationship between theodicy and cosmodicy, Johannes van der Ven argued that the choice between theodicy and cosmodicy is a false dilemma. Philip E. Devenish proposed what he described as "a nuanced view in which theodicy and cosmodicy are rendered complementary, rather than alternative concepts". Theologian J. Matthew Ashley described the relationship between theodicy, cosmodicy and anthropodicy:

Essential kenosis 
Essential kenosis is a form of process theology (related to "open theism") that allows one to affirm that God is almighty, while simultaneously affirming that God cannot prevent genuine evil. Because out of love God necessarily gives freedom, agency, self-organization, natural processes, and law-like regularities to creation, God cannot override, withdraw, or fail to provide such capacities. Consequently, God is not culpable for failing to prevent genuine evil. The work of Thomas Jay Oord explains this view most fully.

Gijsbert van den Brink effectively refutes any view which says God has restricted his power because of his love saying it creates a "metaphysical dualism", and it would not alleviate God's responsibility for evil because God could have prevented evil by not restricting himself. Van den Brink goes on to elaborate an explanation of power and love within the Trinitarian view which equates power and love, and what he calls "the power of love" as representative of God's involvement in the struggle against evil.

See also

 Augustinian theodicy
 Dystheism
 Irenaean theodicy
 Misotheism
 Problem of hell
 Global justice
 Theodicy and the Bible
 Theodicy in Hinduism
 Utilitarianism

Citations

General and cited references 
 
 
 Assman, Jan (2001). The Search for God in Ancient Egypt trans. David Lorton. Cornell University Press
 Birnbaum, David (1989). God and Evil. Ktav Publishing House
 
 
 
 
 
 
 
 Inati, Shams C. (2000). The Problem of Evil: Ibn Sînâ's Theodicy. . Global Academic Publishing, Binghamton University, New York.
 
 
 
 
 
 
 
 Neiman, Susan. Evil in Modern Thought: An Alternative History of Philosophy, 2002, Princeton: Princeton University Press. Revised edition, 2015.
 Oord, Thomas Jay (2015), The Uncontrolling Love of God. Intervarsity Academic.

External links

 Brown, Paterson. "Religious Morality", Mind, 1963.
 Brown, Paterson. "Religious Morality: A Reply to Flew and Campbell", Mind, 1964.
 Brown, Paterson. "God and the Good", Religious Studies, 1967.
 
 Theodicy at New Advent
 Why Does God Allow It? Article discussing men's responsibility on the one hand and his powerlessness regarding natural disasters on the other hand.

 
1710s neologisms
Christian apologetics
God in Christianity
Gottfried Wilhelm Leibniz
Philosophy of religion